Shirpamal is a tourist destination on Jawhar Nashik Road in Dharampur, near to Jawhar City in Maharashtra, India.

Chhatrapati Shivaji Maharaja marched to Surat with the Maratha army. They set up camp near the princely state of Jawhar and met the Koli ruler Vikramshah Mukne of Jawhar.  Together they invaded Surat. Shirpamal was the meeting place of Shivaji and Vikramshah and has since become a historical monument. Chhatrapati Shivali Maharaj Visited Shirpamal at Jawhar on 31 December 1664. On 1 May 1995 Rajaram Mukne, President of Jawhar Municipal Council erected a memorial of Chhatrapati Shivaji Maharaj at this place to commemorate this historic moment.

References 

Historic sites in India
Battlefields
Koli people
1864 establishments in India